Anton "Toni" Pensperger (died 1966) was a West German bobsledder who competed during the 1960s. He was posthumously awarded a gold medal in the four-man event after he was killed during the event at the 1966 FIBT World Championships in Cortina d'Ampezzo. His surviving teammates Ludwig Siebert, Helmut Werzer, and Roland Ebert received their golds as well.

A street in Garmisch-Partenkirchen, Toni Pensperger Strasse, is named in Pensperger's honor.

References
4-Man bobsleigh World Champions
Map showing Toni Pensperger Strasse in Garmisch-Partenkirchen.

1966 deaths
Bobsledders who died while racing
German male bobsledders
Year of birth missing
Sport deaths in Italy